View of the Dam and Damrak at Amsterdam is the name of three similar 17th-century oil on canvas paintings by the Dutch Golden Age painter Jacob van Ruisdael. 

 Frick Collection version
 Boymans van Beuningen version
 Mauritshuis version

The paintings are catalogue number 6, 7 and 8 in Seymour Slive's 2001 catalogue raisonné of Ruisdael.

References

Notes

Bibliography

Paintings by Jacob van Ruisdael
Ships in art
Amsterdam in art